Lit-et-Mixe is a commune in the Landes department in Nouvelle-Aquitaine in south-western France.

The François Ozon film Sous le sable was set in Lit-et-Mixe.

See also
Communes of the Landes department

References

Litetmixe